Ami Dar (born January 7, 1961) is the founder and executive director of Idealist.org. Idealist serves more than 120,000 organizations around the world and has more than 1.4 million visitors every month between the English site (idealist.org), and the Spanish site (idealist.org).

Early life
Dar was born January 7, 1961, in Jerusalem, Israel, the eldest of three children, to a school teacher mother and diplomat father. He grew up in Peru and Mexico, and it was in Mexico City where he first became aware of the contrast of wealth and poverty around him, which started him on a path of dedication to social justice.

In 1976, Dar and his family returned to Israel and from 1979 to 1982, he completed his mandatory service as a paratrooper. During this time Dar had an insight that fundamentally changed his thinking about borders and humanity and how labels define and separate people, which is often referred to as the "sock sharers story".

Career
In 1988, Dar joined Aladdin Knowledge Systems, a software company based in Tel Aviv. From 1988 to 1992 he served as the international marketing manager. In 1992, he was named president and he relocated to New York City to establish their North American branch.

Idealist.org 
By 1995 he had founded an early iteration of Idealist, The Contact Center Network sponsored meeting spaces in several communities where people could connect with neighbors who might share interests and ideas for local action. In 1996 Dar began calling the online network Idealist.org.

Idealists of the World 

In January 2018 the Idealist team launched Idealists of the World which has over 38,000 members worldwide. The Idealists of the World participate in global Idealist Days which occur when the day and the month are the same number. The first global Idealist Day occurred on March 3, 2018 (3/3) with "75 events mobilizing nearly 500 people around the world, and 3000 people in the Idealists of the World Facebook group." The philosophy behind Idealist Day is rooted in Ami Dar's vision of a world progressing towards positive social change. This is accomplished by people making connections online and in person, bridging divides to collaborate for a better tomorrow. Regarding this vision Dar has stated,

Honors and awards
The Stern Family Fund awarded Dar a $100,000 Public Interest Pioneer grant (2000).

Dar was named an Ashoka Fellow (2004). Fellows are leading social entrepreneurs recognized to have innovative solutions to social problems and the potential to change patterns across society. They demonstrate unrivaled commitment to bold new ideas and prove that compassion, creativity, and collaboration are tremendous forces for change. Ashoka Fellows work in over 60 countries around the globe in every area of human need.

He is a board member emeritus of the Nonprofit Technology Network (NTEN), the largest community of nonprofit professionals transforming technology into social change.

Dar was named Time magazine's Philanthropy Innovator (2005).

He was recognized in the Nonprofit Times: Power and Influence, 50 Most Influential People in 2000, 2002, 2003, 2004, and 2005.

Dar received Duke University's Fuqua School of Business, CASE Leadership in Social Entrepreneurship Award (2006).

In 2019 he was named the NonProfit Pro, Nonprofit Professional of the Year.

Publications and speeches 
Dar wrote the foreword to Nonprofit Management 101: A Complete and Practical Guide for Leaders and Professionals. Wiley.com. May 3, 2011.

He gave the commencement address for City University of New York (CUNY) School of Professional Studies on June 23, 2011.

In 2012, Dar was profiled in Forbes magazine.

Dar's career was profiled by Bloomberg News in 2014.

References

Living people
Israeli company founders
People from Jerusalem
Ashoka USA Fellows
Nonprofit chief executives
1961 births